There have been three creations of baronets with the surname Duff, all in the Baronetage of the United Kingdom. Two of the creations are extinct while one is extant.

Assheton-Smith, later Duff baronets, of Vaynol Park (1911)

The Assheton-Smith, later Duff Baronetcy, of Vaynol Park in the County of Carnarfon, was created in the Baronetage of the United Kingdom on 1 August 1911 for Charles Garden Assheton-Smith. The title became extinct on the death of the third Baronet in 1980.

Sir Charles Garden Assheton-Smith, 1st Baronet (1851–1914)
Sir Robert George Vivian Duff, 2nd Baronet (1876–1914)
Sir (Charles) Michael Robert Vivian Duff, 3rd Baronet (1907–1980)

Coat of arms
Shield: Quarterly, 1st and 4th, counter quartered (1st) and (4th) az. 2 bars between three pheons, or (Smith); (2nd) and (3rd) arg. a mullet pierced sa. (Assheton); 2nd and 3rd vert, a fesse dancetty erm., between a stag's head cabossed in chief and two escallops in base or, within a bordure chequy of the last and first (Duff).
Crests
  Issuant from a mural crown, or, 2 arms embowed vested az. cuffed arg. the hands ppr. holding a pheon (Smith);
 a mower in the act of mowing vested per pale arg. and sa., scythe-handle or, blade, ppr. (Assheton);
 a bucks head erased ppr. (Duff)
Motto: Virtute et opera (By virtue and deeds)

Duff baronets, of Hatton (1952)
The Duff Baronetcy, of Hatton in the County of Aberdeen, was created in the Baronetage of the United Kingdom on 3 July 1952 for Garden Beauchamp Duff. He was a descendant of Garden William Duff, whose younger brother Robert George Duff was the ancestor of 1911 baronets of Vaynoll Park. The Earls Fife were members of another branch of this family. The title became extinct on Sir Garden Beauchamp Duff's death in 1952.

Sir Garden Beauchamp Duff, 1st Baronet (1879–1952)

Duff, later Duff-Gordon baronets, of Halkin (1813)
For more information on this creation, see Duff-Gordon baronets.

Notes

References

Kidd, Charles, Williamson, David (editors). Debrett's Peerage and Baronetage (1990 edition). New York: St Martin's Press, 1990,

External links

Duff
Duff, of Vaynol